Meiacanthus kamoharai is a species of combtooth blenny found in coral reefs in the western Pacific ocean, around southern Japan.  This species grows to a length of  TL.

Etymology
The specific name honours the Japanese ichthyologist Toshiji Kamohara (1901-1972) of Kochi University.

References

External links
 

kamoharai
Taxa named by Itiro Tomiyama
Fish described in 1956